Csetény is a village in Veszprém county, Hungary in Zirc District.

External links 
 Street map (Hungarian)

Populated places in Zirc District